Scottsburg is a historic railroad depot located at Scottsburg, Scott County, Indiana. It was built in 1872 by the Jeffersonville, Madison and Indianapolis Railroad, costing almost $1,492. It is a one-story, Stick Style frame building with board and batten siding and a projecting agent's window. Its presence influenced the location of Scottsburg in 1874, as the town was named for the railroad's General Superintendent, Horace Scott. It was built specifically for both passenger and freight cargo. Inside there was separate waiting rooms for men and women. Passenger service to the station ended in the 1950s. It is one of the last structures of its kind still standing in Indiana.

It was placed on the National Register of Historic Places in 1991 as the Scottsburg Depot, but was moved one block north to its present location to help preserve it. With federal transportation funds, it was restored. In 1996 it became the Scottsburg Heritage Station.

References

Railway stations on the National Register of Historic Places in Indiana
Railway stations in the United States opened in 1872
National Register of Historic Places in Scott County, Indiana
Former Pennsylvania Railroad stations
Former railway stations in Indiana
Buildings and structures in Scott County, Indiana
Transportation in Scott County, Indiana